The Roman Catholic Archdiocese of Aparecida is an archdiocese located in the city of Aparecida in Brazil.

History
 19 April 1958: Established as Metropolitan Archdiocese of Aparecida from the Metropolitan Archdiocese of São Paulo and Diocese of Taubaté

Bishops

Archbishops of Aparecida
 Cardinal Carlos Carmelo de Vasconcelos Motta (1964-1982)
 Geraldo María de Morais Penido (1982-1995)
 Cardinal Aloísio Lorscheider, O.F.M. (1995-2004)
 Cardinal Raymundo Damasceno Assis (2004-2016)
 Orlando Brandes (2016–present)

Coadjutor archbishops
Antônio Ferreira de Macedo, C.SS.R. (1964-1977); did not succeed to see
Geraldo María de Morais Penido (1977-1982)

Auxiliary bishop
Darci José Nicioli, C.SS.R. (2012-2016), appointed Archbishop of Diamantina, Minas Gerais

Suffragan dioceses
 Diocese of Caraguatatuba
 Diocese of Lorena
 Diocese of São José dos Campos
 Diocese of Taubaté

References

Sources
 Catholic Hierarchy

Roman Catholic dioceses in Brazil
Roman Catholic ecclesiastical provinces in Brazil
 
Christian organizations established in 1958
Roman Catholic dioceses and prelatures established in the 20th century
1958 establishments in Brazil